The Municipality of Grosuplje is a municipality in central Slovenia. The seat of the municipality is the town of Grosuplje. It lies just south of the capital Ljubljana in the traditional region of Lower Carniola. It is now included in the Central Slovenia Statistical Region.

Settlements
In addition to the municipal seat of Grosuplje, the municipality also includes the following settlements:

 Bičje
 Blečji Vrh
 Brezje pri Grosupljem
 Brvace
 Cerovo
 Cikava
 Čušperk
 Dobje
 Dole pri Polici
 Dolenja Vas pri Polici
 Gabrje pri Ilovi Gori
 Gajniče
 Gatina
 Gorenja Vas pri Polici
 Gornji Rogatec
 Gradišče
 Hrastje pri Grosupljem
 Huda Polica
 Kožljevec
 Lobček
 Luče
 Mala Ilova Gora
 Mala Loka pri Višnji Gori
 Mala Račna
 Mala Stara Vas
 Mala Vas pri Grosupljem
 Male Lipljene
 Mali Konec
 Mali Vrh pri Šmarju
 Malo Mlačevo
 Medvedica
 Paradišče
 Pece
 Peč
 Plešivica pri Žalni
 Podgorica pri Podtaboru
 Podgorica pri Šmarju
 Polica
 Ponova Vas
 Praproče pri Grosupljem
 Predole
 Rožnik
 Sela pri Šmarju
 Šent Jurij
 Škocjan
 Šmarje–Sap
 Spodnja Slivnica
 Spodnje Blato
 Spodnje Duplice
 Tlake
 Troščine
 Udje
 Velika Ilova Gora
 Velika Loka
 Velika Račna
 Velika Stara Vas
 Velike Lipljene
 Veliki Vrh pri Šmarju
 Veliko Mlačevo
 Vino
 Vrbičje
 Zagradec pri Grosupljem
 Žalna
 Železnica
 Zgornja Slivnica
 Zgornje Duplice

References

External links

Municipality of Grosuplje on Geopedia
Grosuplje municipal site
Grosuplje on Web - Drevored.si

 
1994 establishments in Slovenia
Grosuplje